Chesan (Chisaana / Shisaana) is a rural locality (a selo) in Kizhinginsky District, Republic of Buryatia, Russia. The population was 484 as of 2010. There are 10 streets.

Geography 
Chesan is located 54 km northeast of Kizhinga (the district's administrative centre) by road. Bulak is the nearest rural locality.

References 

Rural localities in Kizhinginsky District